Paul Howard may refer to:

 Paul Howard (writer) (born 1971), Irish journalist
 Paul Howard (baseball) (1884–1968), baseball player
 Paul Howard (illustrator) (born 1967), children's illustrator
 Paul Howard (American football) (1950–2020), football player
 Paul Howard (musician) (1895–1980), American jazz saxophonist and clarinetist
 Paul Howard (golfer) (born 1990), English golfer
 Paul Howard (artist curator) (born 1967), English artist curator